Marlboro Township may refer to:

 Marlboro Township, New Jersey
 Marlboro Township, Delaware County, Ohio
 Marlboro Township, Stark County, Ohio

Township name disambiguation pages